The Sixth Federal Electoral District of Chihuahua (VI Distrito Electoral Federal de Chihuahua) is one of the 300 Electoral Districts into which Mexico is divided for the purpose of elections to the federal Chamber of Deputies and one of nine such districts in the state of Chihuahua.

It elects one deputy to the lower house of Congress for each three-year legislative period, by means of the first past the post system.

District territory
Under the 2005 districting scheme, the district covers the western portion of the Chihuahua Municipality, including approximately one-half of the city of Chihuahua.
The other half of the city, and the rest of the municipality, is covered by the Eighth District.

The district's head town (cabecera distrital), where results from individual polling stations are gathered together and collated, is the state capital, the city of Chihuahua.

Previous districting schemes

2005-2017 district
Between 2005 and 2017 the district covers the western portion of the Chihuahua Municipality, including approximately one-half of the city of Chihuahua.

1996–2005 district
Between 1996 and 2005, the district covered the northern part of Chihuahua Municipality; i.e., it included the part of the city/municipality north of the Río Chuviscar.

1979–1996 district
Between 1979 and 1996, the Sixth District was located in the eastern central part of the state, centred on the city of Camargo.

Deputies returned to Congress from this district

Notes

References 

Federal electoral districts of Mexico
Chihuahua (state)